Agrupación Deportiva Parla is a Spanish football team based in Parla, in the autonomous community of Madrid. Founded in 1973 it plays in Tercera División RFEF – Group 7, holding home games at Estadio Los Prados, with a capacity of 4,000 seats.

History 
The club was founded by José Paz Serrano in 1973. During its first 8 years AD Parla won several Regional competitions and reached the Tercera División.

Season to season

5 seasons in Segunda División B
33 seasons in Tercera División
1 season in Tercera División RFEF

References

External links
Official website 
Futbolme team profile 

Football clubs in the Community of Madrid
Association football clubs established in 1973
1973 establishments in Spain
Parla